Marin Transit is a public bus agency in Marin County, California, in the United States. Originally formed in 1964 as Marin County Transit District (MCTD). Marin Transit was re-branded on 30 July 2007 and now provides a variety of fixed-route and demand-response services using contractors.

History 
Marin Transit was formed by a vote of the people of Marin County in 1964 and was given the responsibility for providing local transit service within Marin County. It has since played a key role in providing local transit service within the county through various funding sources (Measure A Funds, State Transportation Development Act Funds, fares, property taxes and Federal Section 5311 rural transit funds). For a history of Marin Transit service in relation to Golden Gate Transit, click here.

Fixed-route bus service 
Marin Transit serves all major cities, towns, and communities within Marin County except Muir Beach, Nicasio, and Peacock Gap (East San Rafael). Route information listed below is current as of 10 June 2018.

See Golden Gate Transit for information on Regional and Commute bus routes serving Marin County, which have no affiliation with Marin Transit.

Regular service 

Note: Italicized locations are served on select trips only.

West Marin Stagecoach and Muir Woods Shuttle

Supplemental service 
Supplemental routes operate on school days only.

Demand-response service 
Marin Transit provides four services that do not operate on fixed routes, as well as ADA complementary paratransit.

Marin Transit Connect 
Marin Transit Connect provides curb-to-curb service in northern San Rafael on weekdays. On-demand service is available by requesting a ride through the Marin Transit Connect app. Passengers without smartphones can schedule rides by calling a phone number.

Dillon Beach/Tomales Dial-a-Ride 
The Dillon Beach/Tomales Dial-a-Ride provides curb-to-curb service from Dillon Beach and Tomales to Petaluma by reservation only. Service operates on Wednesdays.

Novato Dial-a-Ride 
The Novato Dial-a-Ride provides curb-to-curb service within Novato by reservation only. Novato Dial-a-Ride, which replaced the EZ Rider service that served only portions of the city, supplements fixed-route bus service and operates to areas not served by buses, including Bahia, Bel Marin Keys, and Black Point. Service operates daily.

Point Reyes Dial-a-Ride 
The Point Reyes Dial-a-Ride provides curb-to-curb service from Point Reyes to Novato shopping destinations by reservation only. Service operates the first and third Mondays of each month.

Marin Access 
Complementary paratransit service, as mandated by the Americans with Disabilities Act (ADA), is operated within Marin County using the Marin Access name. Service is available to eligible passengers by reservation only. Marin Transit supplements paratransit with the STAR and TRIP volunteer driver programs and Marin Catch-a-Ride program.

Fleet 
As of 2020, Marin Transit owns a fleet of approximately 66 buses.

Marin Transit also uses approximately eight buses owned by the National Park Service, Caltrans, MV Transportation, and Marin Airporter. These vehicles are not reflected in the table above.

Fares 
All Marin Transit fixed-route fares and passes are also valid on Golden Gate Transit bus routes within Marin County.

Fixed-route fares 
These fares do not apply to the Muir Woods Shuttle. See Muir Woods Shuttle fares in the following section.

Notes:
 Up to two children ages 4 and under ride free with an adult.
 College of Marin students ride free with a validated COM card.
 Transfers are issued free upon payment and are valid for one-way travel on all Marin Transit and Golden Gate Transit routes within Marin County for 3 hours. Clipper automatically calculates transfers.

School-based Youth Passes are available to students ages 5 through 18 from Marin County schools. Passes are available for $175.00 for 6 months and $325.00 for one year. Passes allow unlimited rides on all Marin Transit fixed routes (excluding Muir Woods Shuttle). However, unlike other Marin Transit fare media, the passes are not valid on any Golden Gate Transit bus routes.

Muir Woods Shuttle fares 
Round-trip fares on the Muir Woods Shuttle are $3.50 for adults (ages 16 and over) and free for youths (ages 15 and under). No one-way fares are available. Marin Transit fare media and Clipper cards are not accepted. Fares must be purchased online prior to boarding.

Demand-response fares 
Clipper cards are not accepted on any demand-response services. Monthly passes are accepted on Novato Dial-A-Ride only.

Connect2Transit offers discounts on shared rides, including Marin Connect and UberPool. Marin Connect fares are $3.00 for Marin Access users.

See also 

 Golden Gate Transit
 San Rafael Transit Center

Notes 

Public transportation in Marin County, California
Bus stations in Marin County, California
Bus transportation in California
San Rafael, California